Brian B Day is a male former swimmer who competed for England.

Swimming career
He represented England in the 220 yards breaststroke at the 1958 British Empire and Commonwealth Games in Cardiff, Wales.

At the ASA National British Championships he won the 220 yards breaststroke title in 1957. He was also the Yorkshire breaststroke champion and swam for the Sheffield Aquatic Club.

References

English male swimmers
Swimmers at the 1958 British Empire and Commonwealth Games
Commonwealth Games competitors for England